Kurt Madsen (born 8 January 1936) is a Danish wrestler. He competed at the 1964 Summer Olympics and the 1968 Summer Olympics.

References

External links
 

1936 births
Living people
Danish male sport wrestlers
Olympic wrestlers of Denmark
Wrestlers at the 1964 Summer Olympics
Wrestlers at the 1968 Summer Olympics
People from Halsnæs Municipality
Sportspeople from the Capital Region of Denmark